Preston Nomads Cricket Club is a cricket club based in the Village of Fulking in West Sussex, England.  Founded in 1927, the club's first XI plays in the Premier League of the Sussex Cricket League which is an accredited  ECB Premier League, the highest level of recreational club cricket in England and Wales.  In the late 2000s and early 2010s the first XI won the Sussex Premier League six times in eight seasons (2006–13). They are current champions after winning the Sussex Premier league in 2021.

Honours
1st XI
 Sussex Cricket League Premier Division 
 Champions 2006, 2008, 2009, 2010, 2012, 2013, 2021
 Sussex Cricket League Division One (1st XI)
 Champions 1971, 1982, 1988
 Sussex Cup
 Winners 2004
 20/20 Cup
 Winners 2008, 2009, 2011,2015
 ECB National Indoor Six-a-side Club Cricket Championship
 Winners 2009

2nd XI
 Sussex Cricket League Division 1 (2nd XI)
 Champions 1977, 1997, 2005, 2015
 Sussex League Cup
 Winners 2007
 20/20 Cup
 Winners 2015

References

External links
 

Cricket in East Sussex
English club cricket teams
1927 establishments in England
Cricket clubs established in 1927